Children of the New World is a collection of science fiction short stories by Alexander Weinstein.

Content
"Saying Goodbye to Yang"
"The Cartographers"
"Heartland"
"Excerpts from The New World Authorized Dictionary"
"Moksha"
"Children of the New World"
"Fall Line"
"A Brief History of Failed Revolution"
"Migration"
"The Pyramid and the Ass"
"Rocket Night"
"Openness"
"Iceage"

Reception
Children of the New World was chosen by the New York Times as one of the 100 Notable Books of 2016.

Film adaptations
In June 2018, it was reported that producer Theresa Park had acquired the screen rights to "Saying Goodbye to Yang". It was later announced that the adaptation would be directed by South Korean-American filmmaker Kogonada.
Lulu Wang, director of The Farewell, announced in July 2019 that she was working on a sci-fi film as an adaptation of the book.

References

External links
Author's website

2016 short story collections
Science fiction short story collections